The Lafay Independência was a Brazilian twin-engine, biplane aircraft, the first of its kind built in Latin America.

Background
After unsuccessfully trying to build a multipurpose aircraft in partnership with Blackburn Aircraft. Henrique Lage, with the help of the French military attaché Louis Lafay, the Rio de Janeiro airplane was designed, of which there are no technical records about the aircraft, but it served as the basis for Indepêndencia.

Design and development
With the help of a engineer named Braconnot, he built a twin-engine biplane with the capacity to carry five people on board.  Built with Brazilian wood and canvas, it resembled the Caudron G.3, even though it was bigger and heavier.  It used a Clerget engine push-pull type, each with two fixed pitch propellers.

Operational history
The aircraft participated in the welcome flock to Gago Coutinho and Sacadura Cabral, upon their arrival in Rio de Janeiro during first aerial crossing of the South Atlantic. Her fate after June 1922 is unknown.

References

External links
Henrique Lage and Cpt Lafay in the Independência airplane

1920s Brazilian experimental aircraft
1920s Brazilian civil aircraft
Aircraft first flown in 1922
Twin piston-engined tractor aircraft